Sampaiosia is a monotypic genus of Brazilian huntsman spiders containing the single species, Sampaiosia crulsi. It was first described by Cândido Firmino de Mello-Leitão in 1930, and is found in Brazil.

It has been synonymised with Sparianthis by Rheims in 2020.

See also
 List of Sparassidae species

References

Monotypic Araneomorphae genera
Sparassidae
Spiders of Brazil
Taxa named by Cândido Firmino de Mello-Leitão